Home Alone is a 1990 American family comedy Christmas film starring Macaulay Culkin.

Home Alone may also refer to:

Film franchise
Home Alone (franchise), the successful American family comedy action Christmas film series that the 1990 film started
Home Alone 2: Lost in New York (1992), the second film in the series, which brings back most of the previous film's cast, directors, writers, and producers
Home Alone 2: Lost in New York (video game), a video game loosely based on the 1992 film of the same name
Home Alone 3 (1997), the third film in the series with new characters
Home Alone 4: Taking Back the House (2002), the fourth film in the series and the first made-for-television film featuring some of the main characters from the first two films, but with a completely new cast
Home Alone: The Holiday Heist (2012), the fifth film in the series and the second made-for-television film. Like the third film, it has completely new characters
Home Sweet Home Alone (2021), the sixth and final film in the series and the third and final made-for-television film. Like the fourth film, it has completely new characters
Home Alone: Original Motion Picture Soundtrack, the soundtrack album from the 1990 film of the same name composed by John Williams
Home Alone (video game), a 1991 video game based on the 1990 film of the same name
Home Alone (2006 video game), a PS2 game based on the first four films in the series

Film and television
"Home Alone" (The Boondocks), an episode of The Boondocks
"Home Alone" (The Inbetweeners), an episode of The Inbetweeners
"Home Alone" (Johnny Bravo), a 2004 episode of Johnny Bravo
Home Alone Sweep, an episode of Sooty & Co. which is a parody of the Home Alone films

Music
"Home Alone" (R. Kelly song), a 1998 song by R. Kelly from his album R. featuring Keith Murray
Home Alone, a 2016 song by Ansel Elgort

Video games
Home Alone (video game)